Daria Gavrilova and Ellen Perez were the defending champions but Gavrilova chose not to participate. Perez played alongside Storm Sanders but lost in the first round to Nicole Melichar and Demi Schuurs.

Melichar and Schuurs went on to win the title, defeating Hayley Carter and Luisa Stefani in the final, 6–4, 6–3.

Seeds

Draw

Draw

References

External links 
Draw

2020 WTA Tour
2020 Doubles
2020 in French tennis